Neoxizicus is a monotypic genus of Asian bush crickets belonging to the tribe Meconematini in the subfamily Meconematinae. It is only found in Vietnam.

Species 
The Orthoptera Species File currently lists the sole type species: Neoxizicus crassus Gorochov, 1998: from Tam Dao village, Vinh Phu Province.

Note: "Neoxizicus longipennis" Liu & Zhang, 2000 from Yunnan, has now been placed in the genus Tamdaora.

References 

Tettigoniidae genera
Meconematinae
Orthoptera of Asia
Monotypic Orthoptera genera